Brain Invaders is the thirteenth studio album by American punk rock band Zebrahead. It was released in Japan on March 6, 2019, and globally on March 8, 2019. The band announced the album on January 9, 2019, along with a music video for the album's first single, "All My Friends Are Nobodies". This is the first Zebrahead album to be self-released outside of Japan, as well as the final album with lead vocalist Matty Lewis before his departure from the group in 2021.  A deluxe edition featuring bonus material was released on August 9, 2019, and an instrumental version was released on August 7, 2020. The song "All My Friends Are Nobodies" was later featured on the soundtrack of Tony Hawk's Pro Skater 1 + 2.

Track listing

Personnel
Zebrahead
Ali Tabatabaee – lead vocals
Matty Lewis – lead vocals, rhythm guitar
Dan Palmer – lead guitar, backing vocals
Ben Osmundson – bass guitar, backing vocals
Ed Udhus – drums, percussion

Charts

Release history

References

2019 albums
Zebrahead albums